= Absolute Monarchs (band) =

American post-punk band

- Origin: Seattle, Washington, United States
- Genres: Post-Punk, Punk
- Years active: 2008 - 2013
- Label: Good to Die Records
- Members: Shawn Kock (guitar); Joel Schneider (bass/vocals); Mike Stubz (drums); Miki Sodos (guitar)

Absolute Monarchs is an American post-punk Music band from Seattle, Washington.

== History ==
The Absolute Monarchs formed in 2009. In 2011, the band was named one of "6 NW Bands You Need to Know" by Spin.com. In 2012 the band was playing in clubs and acting as an opening band at concerts in the Seattle area. Absolute Monarchs were featured to perform at the 57th Grammy Award Ceremonies at the 2012 Capitol Hill Block Party. The band released one full-length album through Good to Die Records and one 7" through Big Tea Records (UK) before calling it quits in August 2013. Kock and Stubz then went on to form a new band, Blood Drugs. In 2016 the Monarchs reunited to perform at Good to Die Records five year anniversary concert. The group also performed at the 2016 Capitol Hill Block Party and several local venues.

== Members ==
- Shawn Kock - guitar
- Joel Schneider - bass / vocals
- Mike Stubz - drums
- Miki Sodos - guitar

== Discography ==
- 1 (2012)
- "To Hell, Let's Masquerade" / "Thinking Thieves" 7" (2012)
